Rasoul Movahedian-Attar is an Iranian diplomat, formerly Iranian Ambassador to the United Kingdom, appointed 4 July 2006 and held the office until 1 January 2012.

Movahedian previously served as Ambassador to Prague (1991–96) and Lisbon (2000–04). He was also Head of the America Department (1996–2000).

References

Living people
Iranian politicians
Iranian diplomats
Ambassadors of Iran to the United Kingdom
Year of birth missing (living people)
Ambassadors of Iran to Portugal
Ambassadors of Iran to Austria